The name Samuel Preston Moore may refer to:

 Samuel Preston Moore (1710-1785), physician and public official
 Samuel P. Moore (1813-1889), Confederate Surgeon General